The Bristol 29.9 is an American sailboat that was designed by Halsey Chase Herreshoff as a Midget Offshore Racing Class and International Offshore Rule racer and first built in 1977.

Production
The design was built between 1977 and 1986 by Bristol Yachts in Bristol, Rhode Island, United States, but it is now out of production. Total production was 216 examples.

Design
The Bristol 29.9 is a recreational keelboat, built predominantly of fiberglass, with wood trim. It has a masthead sloop rig, a spooned raked stem, a vertical transom, a skeg-mounted rudder controlled by a wheel and a fixed fin keel or optionally, a stub keel and centerboard. It displaces  and carries  of lead ballast.

A taller rig for use in areas with lighter winds was an option. The tall mast was about  taller than standard.

The boat had two factory cabin layouts that were available, differing in the galley location. Both galley layouts have a  stainless steel sink and a two-burner stove. The head has a privacy door and is located forward, just aft of the bow "V"-berth. Additional sleeping space is provided by the dinette settee, a second settee and an aft berth, for a total sleeping accommodation for six people. Interior wood trim is mahogany while the cabin sole is teak.

Ventilation is provided by a scoop-type ventilator forward of the mast, a skylight hatch over the cabin table and a second hatch above the forward cabin. There are ten cabin ports.

The boat has jiffy reefing genoa tracks and four cockpit winches. The mainsheet traveler is mounted on the cabin top.

The design has a PHRF racing average handicap of 193.

Operational history
In a 2005 review in Good Old Boat magazine, writer Karen Larson, described the design, "the 29.9 was designed to race under the International Off-shore Rule (IOR) and Midget Ocean Racing Club (MORC) rules, but people soon realized that it made a better cruiser than racer. At 29 feet 11 inches with a 10-foot 2-inch beam and displacing 8,650 pounds with 3,600 pounds of ballast, it was called “less-than-sprightly” by Practical Sailor."

Jack Hornor, reviewing the design in 2017, in The Spinsheet, noted, "owners report a well mannered boat and general satisfaction with her speed and performance. There is a large rudder that provides a responsive helm and a good sized skeg forward of the rudder for good directional control and to aid in keeping those pesky crab pots off the propeller. I would expect that, with a ballast/displacement ratio of 42%, a relatively wide beam of 10’ 2" and a conservative sail/displacement ratio of 14.8, this is a boat that would stand up to a blow quite well. On the other hand, we sail here on the Chesapeake where summertime winds are often light. I would think a good light air number one genoa would be essential equipment around here."

See also
List of sailing boat types

Similar sailboats
Alberg 30
Alberg Odyssey 30
Annie 30
Aloha 30
Bahama 30
C&C 30
Catalina 30
Catalina 309
CS 30
Grampian 30
Hunter 30
Hunter 30T
Hunter 30-2
Hunter 306
Leigh 30
Mirage 30
Mirage 30 SX
Nonsuch 30
O'Day 30
Pearson 303
Redwing 30
S2 9.2
Seafarer 30
Southern Cross 28

References

Keelboats
1970s sailboat type designs
Sailing yachts
Sailboat type designs by Halsey Herreshoff
Sailboat types built by Bristol Yachts